Here's to You, Charlie Brown: 50 Great Years is a documentary television special featuring a tribute to Charles M. Schulz and his creation Peanuts. This was the final Peanuts project that Charles M. Schulz ever worked on before his death, and it was originally aired on the CBS Television Network in 2000 making it the last Peanuts special to air on CBS.

Cast 
 Faith Hill – Herself
 B.B. King – Himself
 Walter Cronkite – Himself
 Joe Montana – Himself
 Willie Mays – Himself
 Whoopi Goldberg – Host (later replaced by Snoopy as star guest)
 Joe Cipriano – Announcer (later mayor)
 Christopher Johnson – Charlie Brown (voice)
 Charles M. Schulz – Himself
 Joe Torre – Himself
 Corey Padnos – Linus van Pelt (voice)
 Rachel Davey – Lucy van Pelt and Peppermint Patty (voice)
 Bill Melendez – Snoopy and Woodstock (voice)

External links 
 

2000 documentary films
2000 films
Peanuts television documentaries
American documentary films
2000 television specials
2000s American television specials
Documentary specials
2000s American films